The Natural Pool, also known as "conchi" or "Cura di Tortuga", is a natural pool of water located in a very remote area in east Aruba. It is formed by rock and volcanic stone circles. The rugged terrain surrounding the pool makes it accessible only by four-wheel drive, all-terrain vehicles, horseback, or on foot. There is a hiking trail leading from the park entrance.

External links
 Natural Pool Official Aruba Tourism Portal.

Geography of Aruba